The Tatanagar–Yesvantpur Weekly Express is an Express train belonging to South Eastern Railway zone that runs between  and  in India. It was being operated with 18111/18112 train numbers on a weekly basis.

Service

The 18111/Tatanagar–Yesvantpur Weekly Express has an average speed of 56 km/hr and covers 2438 km in 43h 55m. The 18112/Yesvantpur–Tatanagar Express has an average speed of 53 km/hr and covers 2438 km in 46h 00 mins.

Time Table 

From Tatanagar Jn to Yesvantpur - 18111. The train starts from Tatanagar Jn on every Thursday.

Note : Train reverses it's direction at Visakhapatnam Junction & Vijayawada Junction.

From Yesvantpur to Tatanagar Jn - 18112. The train starts from Yesvantpur on every Sunday.

Note : Train reverses it's direction at Visakhapatnam Junction & Vijayawada Junction.

Coach composition

The train had standard LHB rakes with a max speed of 130 kmph. The train consists of 21 coaches:

 2 AC II Tier
 8 AC III Tier
 7 Sleeper coaches
 2 General Unreserved
 1 Divyangjan cum Guard Coach
 1 Generator Car

Traction

Both trains were hauled by a Tatanagar-based WAP-7 diesel locomotive from Tatanagar to Visakhapatnam. From Visakhapatnam, trains were hauled by a Vijayawada-based WAP-4 electric locomotive until Vijayawada. After Vijayawada, either another WAP-4 from Vijayawada took the charge or a Lallaguda based WAP-7 hauled the train. From Guntakal, trains were hauled by either Guntakal-based twin WDM-3A or twin WDG-3A or Diesel Loco Shed, Gooty WDM-3A twin diesel locomotive until Yesvantpur and vice versa.

Direction reversal

The train reverses its direction 2 times:

See also 

 Tatanagar Junction railway station
 Yesvantpur Junction railway station
 Tatanagar–Yesvantpur Superfast Express

Notes

References

External links 

 18111/Tatanagar–Yesvantpur Weekly Express India Rail Info
 18112/Yesvantpur–Tatanagar Weekly Express India Rail Info

Transport in Jamshedpur
Transport in Bangalore
Express trains in India
Rail transport in Jharkhand
Rail transport in Odisha
Rail transport in Andhra Pradesh
Rail transport in Tamil Nadu
Rail transport in Karnataka
Railway services introduced in 2015